The Axel jump or Axel Paulsen jump, named after its inventor, Norwegian figure skater Axel Paulsen, is an edge jump performed in figure skating. It is the sport's oldest and most difficult jump, and the only basic jump in competition with a forward take-off, which makes it the easiest to identify. A double or triple Axel is required in both the short program and the free skating segment for junior and senior single skaters in all events sanctioned by the International Skating Union (ISU).

The triple Axel has become a common technical element in the men's singles discipline, while it is still rare among female single skaters. As of 2021, nineteen women have successfully completed the triple Axel in competition. The quadruple Axel was successfully executed in competition for the first time in 2022, but has not yet been landed by a female skater. Compared to other basic figure skating jumps, the Axel requires an extra half revolution, which makes a triple Axel "more a quadruple jump than a triple", according to figure skating expert Hannah Robbins.

History

The Axel jump, also called the Axel Paulsen jump for its creator, Norwegian figure skater Axel Paulsen, is an edge jump in the sport of figure skating. According to figure skating historian James Hines, the Axel is "figure skating's most difficult jump". It is the only basic jump in competition that takes off forward, which makes it the easiest jump to identify. Skaters commonly perform a double or triple Axel, followed by a jump of lower difficulty in combination. A double or triple Axel is required in both the short programs and free skating segment for junior and senior single skaters in all competitions sanctioned by the International Skating Union (ISU). The Axel jump is the most studied jump in figure skating. In competition, the base value of an Axel is determined by the number of revolutions completed during the jump. In the current +5/-5 GOE judging system, the base value of a single Axel is 1.10, a double Axel 3.30, a triple Axel 8.00, and a quadruple Axel 12.50.

The first skater to accomplish an Axel was its creator, Axel Paulsen, at the first international figure skating competition, which was held in Vienna in 1882. Hines, who called Paulsen "progressive" for inventing it, stated that he did it "as a special figure". By the mid-1920s, the Axel was the only jump that was not being doubled. During the early 1900s, Professional German skater Charlotte Oelschlägel was the first woman to include an Axel in her programs; Hines reported that she would terminate the Axel with her "famous fade-away ending", the Charlotte spiral, a move she invented. In the early 1920s, Sonja Henie from Norway was the first female skater to perform an Axel in competition. It was also reported by Hines that in the 1930s, Austrian skater Felix Kaspar, who was known for his athleticism, performed Axels with a trajectory of four feet height and 20 feet distance from take-off to landing (1.20m height and 6m distance); Hines stated that "there is little doubt in the minds of those who saw him that had the technique then been known, he probably could have easily performed triple or even quadruple jumps". At the 1948 Winter Olympics, American Dick Button was the first skater to complete a double Axel in competition. American Carol Heiss was the first woman to perform a double Axel, in 1953.

The first successful triple Axel in competition was performed by Canadian Vern Taylor at the 1978 World Championships. Six years later, at the 1984 Winter Games in Sarajevo, Canadian skater Brian Orser became the first skater to complete a triple Axel at the Olympics. According to The New York Times, throughout the years, the triple Axel "has become more common for male skaters" to perform. The first female skater to successfully execute a triple Axel in competition was Japanese skater Midori Ito, at a regional competition in the Aichi Prefecture of Japan in 1988. She was also the first woman to land it at an international competition, at the 1988 NHK Trophy, as well as the first woman to land it at the Olympics, in 1992. Since Ito, multiple other women have landed the jump in competition. However, only five have completed the triple Axel in an Olympic program: Ito during her free skate in 1992; Japanese skater Mao Asada in both programs in 2010 as well as her free skate in 2014; American skater Mirai Nagasu in her free skate in the 2018 team event; Russian skater Kamila Valieva in her short proram at the 2022 team event; and Japanese skater Wakaba Higuchi in both programs of the 2022 women's individual event. As of October 2020, twelve women have successfully completed the triple Axel in international competition.

The first throw triple Axel was performed by American pair skaters Rena Inoue and John Baldwin, at the 2006 U.S. National Championships. They were also the first couple to perform a throw triple Axel at the Olympics and international competition, in 2006. At the 2018 Grand Prix of Helsinki, two-time Olympic champion, Yuzuru Hanyu, became the first skater to land a quadruple toe loop-triple Axel jump sequence in international competition. In 2022, American skater Ilia Malinin was the first skater to successfully complete a quadruple Axel in competition at the CS U.S. Classic.

Execution

The Axel is an edge jump, which means that the skater must spring into the air from bent knees. It is the oldest but most difficult figure skating jump. A "lead-up" to the Axel is the waltz jump, a half-revolution jump and the first jump that skaters learn. The Axel has three phases: the entrance phase (which ends with the takeoff), the flight phase, when the skater rotates into the air, and the landing phase, which begins when the skater's blade hits the ice and ends when they are "safely skating backwards on the full outside edge with one leg behind in the air". According to researcher Anna Mazurkiewicz and her colleagues, the most important parts of the entrance phase is the transition phase (also called the pre-takeoff phase) and the takeoff itself. The jump has a forward takeoff, approached with a series of backward crossovers in either the opposite or the same direction to the jump's rotation, followed by a step forward onto the forward outside takeoff edge.

The skater must also approach the jump typically from the left forward outside edge of the skate, enabling them to step forward. The skater then kicks through with their free leg, helping them to jump into the air. The skater must land on the right back outside edge of the skate. The change in foot required to complete the Axel means that the skater's centre of gravity must be transferred from the left side to the right, while rotating in the air, to reach the correct position to land. As a result, the Axel has an extra half-rotation, which, as figure skating expert Hannah Robbins states, "makes a triple Axel more a quadruple jump than a triple": the single Axel consists of one-and-a-half revolutions, the double Axel consists of two-and-half revolutions, and the triple Axel consists of three-and-a-half revolutions.

Sports reporter Nora Princiotti states, about the triple Axel, "It takes incredible strength and body control for a skater to get enough height and to get into the jump fast enough to complete all the rotations before landing with a strong enough base to absorb the force generated". According to American skater Mirai Nagasu, "falling on the triple Axel is really brutal". It has been shown that the more skilled skaters have greater takeoff velocities and jump lengths. When skaters perform double Axels, they exhibit greater rotations during the flight phase, take off in more closed positions, and attain greater rotational velocities than when performing single Axels. They also increase their turns not by increasing the time in the air, but by increasing their rotational velocity when performing single, double, and triple Axels. According to researcher D.L. King, the key to executing a successful triple Axel is "achieving a high rotational velocity by generating angular momentum at take-off and minimising the moment of inertia about the spin axis".

As of January 2023, four skaters have earned a perfect score for the triple Axel jump (since the introduction of the ISU Judging System in 2004): Yuzuru Hanyu, Javier Fernández, Yan Han, and Shoma Uno. Hanyu was awarded a maximum score ten times, the most among skaters. Besides the quality, Hanyu's jump is notable for its consistency, having landed 51 triple Axels with a positive grade of execution (GOE) in 53 international senior short programs, recording only two mistakes in a span of twelve years in that competition segment.

References

Citations

Works cited

Figure skating elements
Jumping sports